Stoyan Predev (born 19 August 1993, in Sofia) is a Bulgarian footballer who plays as a defender for Dunav Ruse.

Career
On 1 July 2018, Predev signed with Kariana.

Career statistics

Club

References

External links
 

1993 births
Living people
Footballers from Sofia
Bulgarian footballers
Association football defenders
First Professional Football League (Bulgaria) players
Second Professional Football League (Bulgaria) players
PFC Slavia Sofia players
FC Vitosha Bistritsa players
FC Sportist Svoge players
FC Septemvri Sofia players
FC Pirin Razlog players
FC Lokomotiv 1929 Sofia players
FC Kariana Erden players